Anund Charles Roark (February 17, 1948 – May 16, 1968) was a United States Army soldier and a recipient of the United States military's highest decoration—the Medal of Honor—for his actions in the Vietnam War.

Biography
Roark joined the Army from Los Angeles, California, in 1966, and by May 16, 1968, was serving as a Sergeant in Company C, 1st Battalion, 12th Infantry Regiment, 4th Infantry Division. On that day, near Landing Zone Brillo Pad in Kontum Province, South Vietnam, during Operation MacArthur Roark smothered the blast of an enemy-thrown hand grenade with his body, protecting his fellow soldiers at the cost of his own life.

Roark, aged 20 at his death, was buried in Fort Rosecrans National Cemetery, San Diego, California.

Medal of Honor citation
Sergeant Roark's official Medal of Honor citation reads:

For conspicuous gallantry and intrepidity in action at the risk of his life above and beyond the call of duty. Sgt. Roark distinguished himself by extraordinary gallantry while serving with Company C. Sgt. Roark was the point squad leader of a small force which had the mission of rescuing 11 men in a hilltop observation post under heavy attack by a company-size force, approximately 1,000 meters from the battalion perimeter. As lead elements of the relief force reached the besieged observation post, intense automatic weapons fire from enemy occupied bunkers halted their movement. Without hesitation, Sgt. Roark maneuvered his squad, repeatedly exposing himself to withering enemy fire to hurl grenades and direct the fire of his squad to gain fire superiority and cover the withdrawal of the outpost and evacuation of its casualties. Frustrated in their effort to overrun the position, the enemy swept the hilltop with small arms and volleys of grenades. Seeing a grenade land in the midst of his men, Sgt. Roark, with complete disregard for his safety, hurled himself upon the grenade, absorbing its blast with his body. Sgt. Roark's magnificent leadership and dauntless courage saved the lives of many of his comrades and were the inspiration for the successful relief of the outpost. His actions which culminated in the supreme sacrifice of his life were in keeping with the highest traditions of the military service, and reflect great credit on himself and the U.S. Army.

See also

List of Medal of Honor recipients for the Vietnam War

References

External links

1948 births
1968 deaths
American military personnel killed in the Vietnam War
United States Army Medal of Honor recipients
Military personnel from California
United States Army non-commissioned officers
Burials at Fort Rosecrans National Cemetery
Vietnam War recipients of the Medal of Honor
Military personnel from Vallejo, California
Deaths by hand grenade
United States Army personnel of the Vietnam War